As a member of the nuclear non-proliferation treaty, South Africa uses nuclear science for peaceful means. South Africa's nuclear programme includes both nuclear energy and nuclear medicine. In the past there was also a military component, and South Africa previously possessed nuclear weapons, which were subsequently dismantled.

Nuclear energy

Koeberg 

 
The Koeberg nuclear power station is the only nuclear power station in South Africa and contains two uranium pressurized water reactors based on a design by Framatome of France. The station is located 30 km north of Cape Town. The plant is owned and operated by the country's national electricity supplier, Eskom.

PBMR 
The Pebble bed modular reactor (PBMR) was a particular design of pebble-bed reactor under development by South African company PBMR (Pty) Ltd since 1994. The project entailed the construction of a demonstration power plant at Koeberg near Cape Town and a fuel plant at Pelindaba near Pretoria. Government financing was withdrawn in 2010 because of missed deadlines and lack of customers.

Research 
The South African Nuclear Energy Corporation (NECSA) was established as a public company by the Republic of South Africa Nuclear Energy Act in 1999 and is wholly owned by the State. NECSA replaced the country's Atomic Energy Corporation. The main functions of NECSA are to undertake and promote research and development in the field of nuclear energy and related technologies; to process and store nuclear material and other restricted material; and to co-ordinate with other organisations in matters falling within these spheres.

The project is currently being dismantled.

Education 
The following South African universities offer courses in nuclear engineering:
 University of the Witwatersrand, Johannesburg
 North-West University, at the Post-graduate School of Nuclear Science and Engineering in Potchefstroom
 University of Cape Town, Cape Town

Nuclear weapons

South Africa built six nuclear bombs in the 1980s, which were subsequently dismantled.

See also
 Vela incident

References 

 Annotated bibliography for the South African nuclear weapons programme from the Alsos Digital Library for Nuclear Issues

Nuclear energy in South Africa
Nuclear technology in South Africa
South Africa
 
South Africa